Tañada is a surname. Notable people with the surname include:

Erin Tañada (born 1963), Filipino lawyer, broadcaster, and human rights and labor rights advocate
Lorenzo Tañada (1898–1992), Filipino nationalist lawyer, senator, and human and civil rights activist 
Wigberto Tañada (born 1934), Filipino politician